City Center East, also known as City Center Plaza, is a high-rise office building in Bellevue, Washington, US. The 26-story,  tower was completed in 2009 and is completely leased by Microsoft, whose Bing development team as well as many AI teams are headquartered there. It is located adjacent to the Bellevue Transit Center and its sister building, City Center Bellevue, which was completed in 1986. City Center East was originally owned by Beacon Capital Partners before it was sold to Cole Real Estate Investments for $310 million in 2010. It was sold again to CommonWealth Partners in 2012, for $347.7 million, a 21 percent increase.

The building was originally proposed as a 34-story,  office tower prior to its downsizing in 2005.

References

Skyscrapers in Bellevue, Washington
Skyscraper office buildings in Washington (state)
Office buildings completed in 2009